Route 66 Records is a record production company founded by Jonas Bernholm that reissues forgotten Rhythm & Blues recordings. Their motto: "The Highway To R&B". They are known to have produced the following compilation albums:

KIX-1: Floyd Dixon: Opportunity Blues
Texas-West Coast R&B and Blues (1948–61)
KIX-2: Roy Brown: Laughing But Crying
New Orleans|Texas-West Coast R&B and Blues (1947–59)
KIX-3: Wynonie Harris: Mr. Blues Is Coming To Town
Blues and R&B Supreme Blues shouter (1946–54)
KIX-4: Ivory Joe Hunter: 7th Street Boogie
West Coast Jump Blues and Boogie (1945–50)
KIX-5: Charles Brown: Sunny Road
Texas-West Coast Club Blues featuring Charles with Johnny Moore's Three Blazers, and New Orleans R&B (1945–60)
KIX-6: Roy Brown: Good Rocking Tonight
Legendary recordings, Vol.2 (1947–54)
KIX-7: Amos Milburn: Just One More Drink (1946–54)
KIX-8: Paul Gayten & Annie Laurie: Creole Gal (1947–57)
KIX-9: Roy Hawkins: Why Do Everything Happen to Me? (1949–54)
KIX-10: Little Willie Littlefield: It's Midnight (1949–57)
KIX-11: Floyd Dixon: Houston Jump (1947–60)
KIX-12: Jimmy McCracklin: Rockin' Man (1945–56)
KIX-13: Billy Wright: Stacked Deck (1949–54)
KIX-14: Bullmoose Jackson: Big Fat Mamas Are Back in Style Again (1945–56)
KIX-15: Ivory Joe Hunter: Jumping at the Dew Drop (1947–52)
KIX-16: Ruth Brown: Sweet Baby of Mine (1949–56)
KIX-17: Charles Brown w/ Johnny Moore's Three Blazers: Race Track Blues (1945–56)
KIX-18: Jimmy Liggins: I Can't Stop It (1947–52)
KIX-19: Larry Darnell: I'll Get Along Somehow (1949–57)
KIX-20: Wynonie Harris: Oh Babe! (1945–54)
KIX-21: Amos Milburn: Rock, Rock, Rock (1947–57)
KIX-22: Percy Mayfield: The Voice Within (1949–56)
KIX-23: Peppermint Harris: I Got Loaded (1950–53)
KIX-24: Little Caesar (musician): Lying Woman... Goodbye Baby (1952/3)
KIX-25: Ivory Joe Hunter: I Had a Girl (1946–52)
KIX-26: Roy Brown: I Feel that Young Man's Rhythm (1947–54)
KIX-27: Floyd Dixon: Empty Stocking Blues (1947–53)
KIX-28: Amos Milburn: Let's Rock a While (1946–54)
KIX-29: Jimmy McCracklin: I'm Gonna Have My Fun (1949–57) 
KIX-30: Wynonie Harris: Playful Baby (1945–54)
KIX-31: Jimmy Witherspoon: Hey Mr. Landlord (1945–56)
KIX-32: Joseph August: Rock My Soul (1949–54)
KIX-33: Johnny Moore's Blazers: Why, Johnny, Why? (1949–56)
KIX-34: Charles Brown: Let's Have a Ball (1945–61)
KIX-35: Calvin Boze: Choo Choo's Bringing My Baby Home (1949–52)
KIX-1200: Various artists: Hunter Hancock Presents Blues & Rhythm Midnight Matinee (1951)

See also
 List of record labels

Swedish record labels
Reissue record labels